Appan may refer to:

People
 Appan Menon (1947 – 1996), Indian journalist
 Appan Thacheth (1937 – 2011), Indian poet
 K. P. Appan (1936 – 2008), Indian literary critic
 M. P. Appan (1913 – 2003), Indian poet
 Shash Appan (b. 1996), Welsh activist

Film
 Appan (film), a 2022 Indian film